Mecistogaster jocaste is a species of damselfly in the family Pseudostigmatidae. It is found in South America.

Subspecies
These five subspecies belong to the species Mecistogaster jocaste:
 Mecistogaster jocaste jocaste Hagen, 1869
 Mecistogaster jocaste sincera McLachlan, 1877
 Mecistogaster jocaste sincerus McLachlan, 1877
 Mecistogaster jocaste vicentius Ris, 1918
 Mecistogaster jocaste vincentius Ris, 1918

References

Further reading

 

Pseudostigmatidae
Articles created by Qbugbot
Insects described in 1869